Georgina Elizabeth Cowper-Temple, Lady Mount Temple (née Tollemache; (1822 – 17 October 1901) was a British religious enthusiast, humanitarian, and animal welfare campaigner. She was the second wife of William Cowper-Temple, 1st Baron Mount Temple. Lady Mount Temple was active in the Temperance Movement and the Royal Society for the Prevention of Cruelty to Animals and was a co-founder of the Plumage League.

Early life and family 
Lady Mount Temple was born Georgina Elizabeth Tollemache on 8 November to Admiral John Richard Delap Tollemache and Lady Elizabeth Stratford. One source says she was probably born in 1821. Her father, whose original surname was Halliday, assumed by royal license the surname and arms of his mother, Lady Jane Tollemache, who was the daughter and co-heiress of Lionel Tollemache, 4th Earl of Dysart. Her mother was the daughter of John Stratford, 3rd Earl of Aldborough. She was the sister of John Tollemache, 1st Baron Tollemache. Lady Mount Temple was a close friend and distant cousin of Constance Lloyd, the wife of Oscar Wilde.

Humanitarianism and animal welfare 

Lady Mount Temple was one of the leaders of the Torquay Anti-Vivisection Society. She also co-founded the Plumage League.

She was active in the Band of Mercy, whose first president was her husband, and the Royal Society for the Prevention of Cruelty to Animals. Lady Mount Temple was also involved in the Temperance Movement.

In 1903, a birdbath with a bronze statue of Lady Mount Temple, designed by Arthur George Walker, was erected in Babbacombe. A horse trough near the Torre railway station is also dedicated to her.

Personal life 
On 22 November 1848, she married The Honourable William Cowper, son of the 5th Earl Cowper. She and her husband had no natural children, but adopted a daughter named Juliet Latour Temple, in 1869. In 1880, her husband was elevated to the peerage as Baron Mount Temple.

Lady Mount Temple was a friend of the writer John Ruskin, the poet Dante Gabriel Rossetti, and the suffragist Frances Power Cobbe.

She lived at Babbacombe Cliff and also owned properties in Ireland. She died in 1901. After her death, part of her estate was bequeathed to the Church Army and to the Victoria Street Society of Protection of Animals from Vivisection.

References 

1820s births
1901 deaths
Year of birth uncertain
British animal welfare workers
British baronesses
Georgina
English humanitarians
English temperance activists
Evangelical Anglicans
People in Christian ecumenism
Georgina
Wives of younger sons of peers
Women humanitarians